Xylocopa appendiculata is a species of carpenter bee in the family Apidae.

References

Further reading

External links

 

appendiculata
Articles created by Qbugbot
Insects described in 1852